Yana Karapetovna Egorian (also spelled Yegoryan, born 20 December 1993) is a Russian left-handed sabre fencer, six-time team European champion, two-time team world champion, 2016 individual Olympic champion, and 2016 team Olympic champion.

Biography
Yana Egorian was born in Tbilisi, Georgia. When she was 6 years old, she moved to Khimki, Moscow Oblast.

Achievements

Egorian won two silver medals at the European Cadet Championships (2009 and 2010). At the Inaugural 2010 Youth Olympics in Singapore, she won two gold medals. She finished fifth at the 2010 Cadet World Championships in Baku. On 8 August 2016, Egorian won the individual gold medal in the 2016 Summer Olympics held in Rio de Janeiro. On 13 August, she won her second Olympic gold medal in the team event. The Russian team, composed of Egorian, Sofya Velikaya, Yuliya Gavrilova and Ekaterina Dyachenko, came away with the gold medal, defeating Team Ukraine (the 2008 Olympic women's team sabre champion) in the final 45–30.

She finished 2016 as Nr. 1 in the FIE women's sabre rating.

Egorian was named The Athlete of the Year by the Ministry of Sport of the Russian Federation.

Medal Record

Olympic Games

World Championship

European Championship

Grand Prix

World Cup

Honours and awards
Order of Honour (25 August 2016) – for high achievements at the 31st Olympic Games in Rio de Janeiro, Brazil, the will to win and goal-oriented approach.
Medal "For Strengthening of Brotherhood in Arms" (2016).

See also
 List of Olympic medalists in fencing (women)
 List of Youth Olympic Games gold medalists who won Olympic gold medals

References

External links
 
 
 
 
 
 
 

1993 births
Living people
Sportspeople from Yerevan
Russian female sabre fencers
Russian sportspeople of Armenian descent
Russian people of Armenian descent
Armenian emigrants to Russia
Fencers at the 2010 Summer Youth Olympics
Olympic fencers of Russia
Olympic medalists in fencing
Fencers at the 2016 Summer Olympics
Medalists at the 2016 Summer Olympics
Olympic gold medalists for Russia
Universiade medalists in fencing
Universiade bronze medalists for Russia
Youth Olympic gold medalists for Russia
Medalists at the 2013 Summer Universiade